Greer Shephard is an American television producer and director. She was an executive producer on the FX series Nip/Tuck. She is also an executive producer on the TNT series, The Closer. Along with Michael M. Robin, Shephard created the Shephard/Robin production company which produces the Ryan Murphy-created Nip/Tuck and Popular. Shephard is an executive producer of TNT's The Closer spinoff series Major Crimes.

In 1991, she joined ABC to serve as vice president of drama programming. She ultimately left in 1997. In 1998, she and director Michael M. Robin launched The Shephard/Robin Company with a commitment deal at Buena Vista TV Productions. In 2001, both Shephard along with Robin, after three years who had served at Disney, joined Warner Bros. Television, who then had a strong relationship with the studio since then through the Shephard/Robin production company.

References

External links
 

American television directors
American television producers
American women television producers
Living people
Place of birth missing (living people)
Year of birth missing (living people)
American women television directors
21st-century American women